Organization Studies is a monthly peer-reviewed academic journal that covers the field of organization studies. The journal's editors-in-chief are Renate Meyer and Paolo Quattrone. It was established in 1980 and is published by SAGE Publications on behalf of European Group for Organizational Studies (EGOS).

Organization Studies accepts both empirical and conceptual articles. In 2019, EGOS announced the creation of a new open access journal dedicated to review and conceptual articles, called Organization Theory, and edited by Joep Cornelissen.

The journal played a prominent role in advancing New institutionalism.

Abstracting and indexing 
The journal is abstracted and indexed in Scopus and the Social Sciences Citation Index. According to the Journal Citation Reports, its 2013 impact factor is 2.504, ranking it 30th out of 172 journals in the category "Management". The journal is on the Financial Times top 50 list, along with only eight other generalist management journals.

References

External links 
 
 European Group for Organizational Studies

Business and management journals
English-language journals
Monthly journals
Publications established in 1980
SAGE Publishing academic journals